= Stephanie Tyler (politician) =

American politician

Stephanie Tyler is an American politician who formerly served as a member of the Nevada Senate. Later, she worked as a lobbyist at the California State Legislature.

In 2006, she worked as a political director for Arnold Schwarzenegger re-election campaign.
